Mazgerd (also Romanized as Māzgerd and Mazāgerd; also known as Mārgaz) is a village in Kuh Shah Rural District, Ahmadi District, Hajjiabad County, Hormozgan Province, Iran. At the 2006 census, its population was 705, in 139 families.

References 

Populated places in Hajjiabad County